Sign is FLOW's eighteenth single. Its A-Side was used as the sixth opening theme song for Naruto Shippuden. The single has two editions: regular and limited. The limited edition includes a bonus CD with extra tracks, a wide cap sticker, double-sided jacket, and Sharingan sticker. It reached number 4 on the Oricon charts in its first week and charted for 6 weeks.

Track listing

Limited edition track listing

Bonus DVD track listing

References

2010 singles
2010 songs
Flow (band) songs
Ki/oon Music singles
Naruto songs